The Portage Trail Conference or PTC is an association of six high schools and their associated middle/junior high schools located in the northeast region of the U.S. State of Ohio. Three member schools are in Portage County, two are in Stark County, and one each is located in Summit and Trumbull counties. The conference officially began play in August 2005 with 16 member schools divided into two eight-school divisions based on enrollment, with the smaller schools in the County Division and the larger schools in the Metro Division. Games against teams in the opposite division did not count as conference games. Between 2013 and 2017, the conference experienced a number of membership changes, with four schools leaving and three schools joining. In 2020 the PTC underwent its largest changes since its inception as 10 schools left the conference. Two schools left the County Division to join different leagues while all eight Metro Division member schools left to form their own conference, the Metro Athletic Conference. Two smaller independent schools joined the five remaining PTC schools for the 2020–21 school year and the County Division name was dropped. As of the 2021–22 school year, the conference competes with a total of six schools.

Current members

Former members

History
The PTC was formed as an expansion and reorganization of the original Portage County League or PCL, which had existed for most of the 20th century and by 2003 included eight high schools in Portage County and two in neighboring Summit County. Beginning in 2003, school leaders in the league began to explore the possibilities of expansion and realignment to better meet the needs of all the schools involved due to the vast differences in enrollments at member schools.

Final Portage County League members:
 Crestwood Red Devils
 Field Falcons
 Garfield G-Men
 Mogadore Wildcats
 Rootstown Rovers
 Southeast Pirates
 Streetsboro Rockets
 Waterloo Vikings
 Windham Bombers
 Woodridge Bulldogs
It was decided to expand the league and divide it into two divisions based on enrollment figures. Initially Ravenna, Norton, Springfield, East Canton, and Coventry accepted invitations to join the new league beginning in 2005. Later in the year, following news that the Western Reserve Conference (which had just lost member Ravenna) would be losing at least two additional member schools (leaving the South Division with just four teams), Kent Roosevelt left the WRC and accepted an invitation to join the new league effective in 2005 after initially choosing to remain in the WRC.

The Metro Division contained the larger schools, which competed in Ohio's Divisions III and IV for football, while the County Division contained the smaller schools, who competed in divisions IV-VII. Because they were based on enrollment, a school's membership in a given division could change if enrollment numbers change. Games between teams of the same division counted in conference standings, while games against schools from the other division were treated as non-conference games.

In January 2011, the PTC announced that due to a change in enrollment figures, Streetsboro would move to the Metro Division and Southeast would move to the County Division for the 2011–12 school year. East Canton announced in February 2011 that they would leave the PTC following the 2012–13 sports season to join the Inter-Valley Conference. In July 2011, Windham announced their own departure from the conference citing enrollment issues. They also left the PTC after the 2012–13 school year and joined the Northeastern Athletic Conference. The PTC heard presentations from four area high schools (Barberton, Northwest, St. Thomas Aquinas, and Lake Center Christian) in May 2011, prior to the announcement that Windham would also be leaving the conference in 2013. Rather than expand, however, the PTC chose to stay at 14 teams, and Streetsboro moved back to the County Division for the 2013–14 school year. In September 2013, Kent Roosevelt announced plans to leave the PTC for the Suburban League beginning in the 2016–17 school year, later changed to the 2015–16 school year.

In December 2013, Cloverleaf announced it would leave the Suburban League for the Portage Trail Conference in 2015. Lake Center Christian announced it would join at the same time. The two schools officially joined in July 2015 and began conference play in August. At the same time, the divisions were reorganized, with Streetsboro and Woodridge changing to the Metro Division with new member Cloverleaf, and Crestwood moving to the County Division along with new member Lake Center Christian.Waterloo High School announced intentions in early 2016 to leave the conference after the 2016–17 season. They began play in the Mahoning Valley Athletic Conference in August 2017. Valley Christian School in Youngstown was announced in December 2016 as the PTC's newest member, and began PTC play in August 2017, joining from the North Coast League.

On 15 April 2019, the eight Metro Division schools announced plans to break away from the PTC and start a new conference (the Metro Athletic Conference) beginning with the 2020–21 school year. In response to this Crestwood (then the largest school in the County Division) announced it was considering leaving the PTC for the Chagrin Valley Conference, which was made official by a board of education vote on 9 July 2019.

Next, Valley Christian announced it was leaving after the 2019–20 school year to join the Eastern Ohio Athletic Conference, with Garrettsville Garfield announcing it was leaving after the 2020–21 school year to join the Mahoning Valley Athletic Conference.

In the wake of these events, four of the remaining County Division schools (Mogadore, Rootstown, Southeast and Lake Center Christian) began a search for schools to join the conference in order to keep it intact. On 5 February 2020 it was announced that beginning with the 2020–21 school year St. Thomas Aquinas (Stark County) and Warren JFK (Trumbull County) would join the conference, bringing the eventual final total to six schools (with five competing in football).

Championships
The PTC has championships in 18 different sports, the most recent additions being the boys' and girls' bowling tournament in 2007 and regular-season competition in 2008.  Most sports have champions for each division, with the exceptions of boys' tennis and girls' tennis, which are not divided into divisions because a limited number of schools offer the sport. In football, baseball, basketball, soccer, softball, and volleyball, the division champion is determined by the results of regular-season play.  Other sports—cross country, golf, bowling, track and field, tennis, and wrestling—weigh the regular-season and season-ending conference tournaments equally as part of determining the season's overall champion.

Football

Boys' cross country
Overall conference winner based on combination of regular-season finish and tournament finish.

Girls' cross country
Overall conference winner based on combination of regular-season finish and tournament finish.

Girls' tennis
Overall conference winner based on combination of regular-season finish and tournament finish.

Golf
Overall division winner based on combination of regular-season finish and tournament finish.

Boys' soccer

Girls' soccer

Girls' volleyball

Boys' basketball

Girls' basketball

Wrestling
Overall division winner based on combination of regular-season finish and tournament finish.

Boys' bowling
Overall conference winner based on combination of regular-season finish and tournament finish.  Beginning in 2010, champions were crowned in both Metro and County divisions.

Girls' bowling
Overall conference winner based on combination of regular-season finish and tournament finish.  Beginning in 2010, champions were crowned in both Metro and County divisions.

Boys' track & field
Overall division winner based on division meet finish.

Girls' track & field
Overall division winner based on combination of regular season and division meet finish.

Baseball

Softball

Boys' tennis
Overall conference winner based on combination of regular-season finish and tournament finish.

References

Ohio high school sports conferences